Tent pegging at the 2010 Asian Beach Games was held from 9 December to 13 December 2010 in Barkah Equestrian Grounds, Muscat, Oman.

Medalists

Medal table

Results

Individual lance
9 December

Team lance
12 December

Rings & pegs
9 December

Pairs file
12 December

Individual sword
10 December

Team sword
13 December

Lemons & pegs
10 December

Indian file
13 December

References 

Official Site

2010 Asian Beach Games events